The Artful Husband is a 1717 comedy play by the British writer William Taverner. Staged at the Lincoln's Inn Fields Theatre, it ran for fifteen nights. It was frequently revived during the eighteenth century.

The cast included Thomas Elrington as Sir Harry Freelove, Theophilus Keene as Winwife, James Spiller as Stockwell, George Pack as Frank Flash, Jane Rogers as Mrs Winwife and Sarah Thurmond as Belinda. The part of Lady Upstart was played by the veteran actress Frances Maria Knight.

List of Characters 

 Sir Harry Freelove - Mr Elrington
 Lady Upstart - Mrs Knight
 Mr Winwife - Mr Keene
 Mrs Winwife - Mrs Rogers
 Belinda - Mrs Thurmond
 Mr Stockwel - Mr Spiller
 Frank Flash - Mr Pack
 Steward to Winwife - Mr Rogers
 Ned, servant to Sir Harry - Mr Knapp
 Butler - Mr Hall
 Decoy, a procuress - Mrs Kear
 Maria, a pretended French woman - Mrs Schoolding
 Four servants to Lady Upstart
 Servant to Belinda
 Servants to Mrs Winwife.
 Two chairmen

References

Bibliography
 Burling, William J. A Checklist of New Plays and Entertainments on the London Stage, 1700-1737. Fairleigh Dickinson Univ Press, 1992.
 Howe, Elizabeth. The First English Actresses: Women and Drama, 1660-1700. Cambridge University Press, 1992.

1717 plays
West End plays
Plays by William Taverner
Comedy plays